This is a list of people who served as Lord Lieutenant of County Waterford.

There were lieutenants of counties in Ireland until the reign of James II, when they were renamed governors. The office of Lord Lieutenant was recreated on 23 August 1831.

Governors

 George Beresford, 1st Marquess of Waterford: 1766–1800 
 Henry Beresford, 2nd Marquess of Waterford 1801–1826
 Lord George Beresford: 1826–1831

Lord Lieutenants
 The 1st Baron Stuart de Decies: 17 October 1831 – 23 January 1874
 Sir Richard Musgrave, 4th Bt.: 9 March 1874 – 8 July 1874
 The 5th Marquess of Waterford: 19 August 1874 – 23 October 1895
 The 8th Duke of Devonshire: 7 December 1895 – 24 March 1908
 Henry Charles Windsor Villiers-Stuart 7 July 1908 – 8 September 1908
 Edmond de la Poer 5 February 1909 – 30 August 1915
 John William Rivallon de la Poer 22 December 1915 – 1922

References

Waterford